Jessy Keeffe (born 17 July 1996) is a retired Australian rules footballer who played for Brisbane in the AFL Women's competition (AFLW).

After not playing a game in her first AFLW season in 2018, she was delisted by Brisbane. However, they re-signed her as a free agent before the 2019 season, and she made her AFLW debut in the Lions' round 4 game against  at Whitten Oval on 23 February 2019.

At the end of the 2021 season, Keeffe announced her retirement after 11 games with the Lions, citing mental health challenges.

Her brother, Lachlan Keeffe, plays for the Greater Western Sydney Giants in the Australian Football League.

References

External links

1996 births
Living people
Sportswomen from Queensland
Australian rules footballers from Queensland
Brisbane Lions (AFLW) players